Czarna Woda  (formerly ) is a town in Starogard County, Pomeranian Voivodeship, Poland, with 2,735 inhabitants as of December 2021.

The town's name translates to "Black Water".

Gallery

References

Cities and towns in Pomeranian Voivodeship
Starogard County